AAAAA (5A) is awarded to the most important and best-maintained tourist attractions in the People's Republic of China, given the highest level in the rating categories used by the Ministry of Culture and Tourism. As of 2020, there are 279 tourist attractions listed as 5A.

History
The origins of the rating system for tourist attractions are based on criteria first set out in 1999 by the China National Tourism Administration (predecessor to the current Ministry of Culture and Tourism) and revised in 2004. The criteria include quality and management factors like ease of transportation links, site safety, cleanliness, etc., and also takes into account the uniqueness and recognition of the sightseeing offers. Tourist attractions were graded according to the criteria on a scale initially from  A to AAAA with AAAAA or 5As added on later as the highest rating. A group of 66 tourist attractions was certified as the first set of AAAAA rated tourist attractions in 2007. The first batch included many of the most iconic historical sites in China including the Forbidden City and Summer Palace. Additional batches of additional sites have been added including 20 new 5A sites in February 2017. On rare occasions, a few locations have been downgraded from the highest rating category for deficiencies in visitor experience.

List

Downgrading
Tourist sites found deficient by the China National Tourism Administration (merged into the Ministry of Culture and Tourism in 2018) have lost their 5A accreditation due to deficiencies in visitor experience. In 2015, Shanhai Pass in Hebei was the first tourist site to be downgraded from 5A. The next wave of downgrading occurred in 2016 with the removal of Orange Isle in Hunan and Shenlong Gorge in Chongqing for "security concerns, overpricing, poor environmental management and poor facility maintenance, as well as bad service mainly resulting from a lack of staff members."

See also
List of protected areas of China
List of national parks of China

References

External links
Complete list of AAAA tourist attractions (Chinese) at the website of the central government of the People's Republic of China

 
Tourism in China
Tourist Attraction Rating Categories of China